Wallis is a surname of English and Scottish origin. It is a variant spelling of Wallace, a common family name in Scotland.

The surname may refer to:

Alfred Wallis (1855–1942), Cornish fisherman and artist.
Annabelle Wallis (born 1984), British actress 
Barnes Wallis (1887–1979), British scientist - inventor of the bouncing bomb
Diana Wallis, British politician
E. A. Wallis Budge (1857–1954), Egyptologist
Gary Wallis, percussionist for rock group Pink Floyd
George Olivier, count of Wallis (1671–1743), Habsburg Austrian field marshal
Gustav Wallis (1830–1878), German plant collector
Hal B. Wallis (1898–1986), American motion picture producer
Henry Wallis (1830–1916), British painter
Hilda Wallis (1900–1979), Irish tennis player
Hugh Wallis (died 1994), Australian cinema entrepreneur, founder of Wallis Cinemas in Adelaide
Jim Wallis, American social justice Christian activist
Jimmy Wallis, British athlete
John Wallis (1616–1703), British mathematician
John Braithwaite Wallis (1877–1961), Canadian entomologist
Jon Wallis, British professional footballer
Joni Wallis, American cognitive neurophysiologist
Katherine Wallis (1861–1957), Canadian artist
Ken Wallis, British pilot
Larry Wallis (1949–2019), British rock musician
Michael Wallis (born 1945), American journalist and popular historian 
Olivier, Count of Wallis (1742–1799), Habsburg Austrian general
Provo Wallis (1791–1892), British Naval officer
Quvenzhané Wallis, born in 2003, American child actress
Ruth Wallis, American singer
Samuel Wallis (1720–1795), English navigator, for whom Wallis Island is named
Shani Wallis, British actress and singer
Stewart Wallis, advocate for transition to new economic system 
Thomas Wallis, (1873–1953), British Art Deco architect. Established Wallis, Gilbert and Partners
W. Allen Wallis (1912–1998), American economist and statistician

Fictional characters 
 Baron Wallis / Mother's Milk (M.M.), a fictional character in The Boys franchise
 Janine Wallis, M.M.'s and Monique's daughter
 Michael Wallis, M.M.'s younger brother
 Monique Wallis, M.M.'s abusive ex-wife
 Mother Wallis, M.M.'s deformed mother
 Mr. Wallis, M.M.'s lawyer father

See also 
 Wallis (given name)
 Wallace (surname) (original form)
 Wallis (disambiguation)

References 

English-language surnames
Ethnonymic surnames